Dead Man's Shoes is a studio recorded album released by British AOR/hard rock band FM. Dead Man's Shoes was released in 1995 on the Raw Power record label.

Track listing 
 "Nobody's Fool" (Overland, Goldsworthy, Jupp, Barnett, Davis) - 5:33
 "Ain't No Cure for Love" (Overland, Goldsworthy, Jupp, Barnett, Davis) - 4:16
 "Get Ready" (Smokey Robinson) - 3:57
 "Don't Say" (Overland, Goldsworthy, Jupp, Barnett, Davis) - 4:28
 "Mona" (Overland, Goldsworthy, Jupp, Barnett, Davis) - 4:55
 "Sister" (Overland, Goldsworthy, Jupp, Barnett, Davis) - 4:39
 "You're the One" (Overland, Goldsworthy, Jupp, Barnett, Davis) - 5:32
 "Tattoo Needle" (Overland, Goldsworthy, Jupp, Barnett, Davis) - 5:11
 "Misery" (Overland, Goldsworthy, Jupp, Barnett, Davis) - 5:53
 "Dead Man's Shoes" (Overland, Goldsworthy, Jupp, Barnett, Davis) - 4:58

Personnel 
 Steve Overland - Lead vocals, guitar
 Merv Goldsworthy - Bass, vocals
 Pete Jupp - Drums, vocals
 Andy Barnett - Lead guitar, vocals
 Jem Davis - Keyboards

Production 
Produced by Merv Goldsworthy, Steve Overland, Pete Jupp, Andy Barnett, Jem Davis and Andy Reilly
Mixed by Andy Reilly
Engineered by Andy Reilly and Andy Barnett
Assisted by Steve Clow
Recorded at Chapel Studios (Lincolnshire) and Rotunda Studios (Berkshire)

References 

FM (British band) albums
1995 albums